Operation is a battery-operated game of physical skill that tests players' eye-hand coordination and fine motor skills. The game's prototype was invented in 1964 by John Spinello, a University of Illinois industrial design student at the time, who sold his rights to the game to renowned toy designer Marvin Glass for a sum of US$500 and the promise of a job upon graduation (a promise that was not upheld). Initially produced by Milton Bradley in 1965, Operation is currently made by Hasbro, with an estimated franchise worth of US$40 million.

The game is a variant of the old-fashioned electrified wire loop game popular at funfairs. It consists of an "operating table", lithographed with a comic likeness of a patient (nicknamed "Cavity Sam") with a large red lightbulb for his nose. On the surface are several openings, which reveal cavities filled with fictional and humorously named ailments made of plastic. The general gameplay requires players to remove these plastic ailments with a pair of tweezers without touching the edge of the cavity opening.

Gameplay
Operation includes two sets of cards, "Doctor" and "Specialist." The Specialist cards are dealt out evenly amongst the players at the start of the game, and any extra cards are removed from play. The Doctor cards are shuffled to form a deck and placed face-down.

In the US and Australian versions, players take turns drawing the top Doctor card from the deck, offering a cash payment for removing a particular ailment. The player in control uses a pair of tweezers (dubbed "Electro Probe" in earlier versions), connected to the board by a wire, to remove the piece without touching the metal edges of the cavity in which it rests. Successfully doing so awards the value on the card, while a failure gives the player holding the Specialist card for that ailment (if any) a chance to remove it for double value. If the Specialist card holder also fails, or if no player is holding it, the Doctor card is returned to the bottom of the deck. Cards of both types are put out of play as their aliments are removed.

If a player draws a particular Doctor card while holding the corresponding Specialist card, he/she may deliberately fail the first attempt in order to have a second chance for double value.

The winner is the player with the most money after all ailments have been removed.

The game can be difficult, due to the shapes of the plastic ailments and the fact that the openings are barely larger than the pieces themselves.

Play pieces
Adam's Apple: an apple in the throat ($100). The term "Adam's apple" is colloquial and refers to the thyroid cartilage surrounding the larynx that becomes more visually prominent during puberty.
Broken Heart: a heart-shape with a crack through it on the right side of the chest ($100). The phrase "broken heart" refers to an emotional feeling in which someone is very sad for any reasons (such as a person's breakup with their romantic partner).
Wrenched Ankle: a wrench in the right ankle ($100). The term "wrenched ankle" is alternative for a sprained ankle.
Butterflies in Stomach: a large butterfly in the middle of the torso. Its name comes from the feeling in the stomach when feeling nervous, excited or afraid. (worth $100)
Spare Ribs: two ribs that are fused together as one piece ($150). "Spare ribs" are a cut of meat or a dish prepared from that cut.
Water on the Knee: a pail of water in the knee ($150). The term "water on the knee" is colloquial and refers to fluid accumulation around the knee joint.
Funny Bone: a cartoon-styled bone ($200). This is a reference to the colloquial term of the distal portion of the ulnar nerve, which is vulnerable to an injury at the elbow.
Charlie Horse: a small horse that rests near the hip joint ($200). A "charley horse" is a sudden spasm in the leg or foot that usually can be cured by massage or stretching. It also looks like a rocking horse.
Writer's Cramp: a pencil in the forearm ($200). A "writer's cramp" is soreness in the wrist that usually can be cured by resting it.
Ankle Bone Connected to the Knee Bone: a rubber band that must be stretched between two pegs at the left ankle and knee. This is the only non-plastic piece in the game and the only card that requires the player to insert rather than remove something ($200). Its name is taken from the African-American spiritual of "Dem Bones".
Wish Bone: a wishbone similar to that of a chicken located on the left side of the chest ($300). The term "wishbone" is colloquial for the furcula which is a bone that can be found in birds and other animals. Traditionally, a chicken's furcula may be used by two people for making competing wishes.
Brain Freeze: an ice-cream cone located in the brain. It refers to the experience of "brain freeze", a headache felt after consuming frozen desserts and iced drinks too quickly ($600). This was added in 2004 when Milton Bradley allowed fans a chance to vote on a new piece to be added to the original game during the previous year, during the promotion of "What's Ailing Sam?". Voters had been given three choices and could make their selection via the company's official website, or by phone for a chance to win a $5,000 shopping spree. The winning piece had beat out tennis elbow and growling stomach.
Bread Basket: a slice of bread and one of the most difficult pieces to remove, with a small notch taken out of the top for grip ($1,000). The word "breadbasket" is a slang name for the stomach.

Other variations
In 2009, Hasbro released the first major update to Operation called Operation Sound FX. This is the first version of Operation to remove the buzzer and cards in place of a speaker. This meant that the game could call out the ailment needed to be removed by the player by using an audio cue, such as a "twang" sound for the rubber-band and a busy tone for the cell phone. Players have to press Sam's nose every time they successfully remove an ailment, if all the aliments were removed and Sam's nose was pressed on the final called ailment, the game would play a victory song. It also includes a standard game of Operation by sliding the power button to the "lightning bolt" setting.

Licensed variations of Operation, based on popular intellectual properties, also exist, such as multiple versions of a Spider-Man-themed Operation where the titular Marvel superhero is the patient the player must treat, as well as a Fallout one where the player must treat Vault-Tec's mascot, Vault Boy, in which a "rads" alarm replaces Sam's nose buzzer.

A video game app was also released. It is only available on mobile devices.

In 2020, Hasbro introduced a new variation of the game called Operation Pet Scan, in which players have to remove objects from a dog's digestive tract.

The Dutch version of the game is called "Dokter Bibber," which translates to "Doctor Shaky."

Reviews
Games and Puzzles

References

External links

Operation Homepage at Hasbro

Board games introduced in 1965
Games of physical skill
1960s toys
Milton Bradley Company games
Board games of physical skill
Electronic board games